Maimai (stylized as all lowercase) is an arcade rhythm game series developed and distributed by Sega, in which the player interacts with objects on a touchscreen and executes dance-like movements. The game supports both single-player and multiplayer gameplay with up to 4 players.

The game is mainly available in Japan, later with an English-language version available to overseas regions including Taiwan and Hong Kong and a simplified Chinese version for China.

The PiNK PLUS version of the game was location tested in the United States at Dave & Buster's in Irvine, California in December 2016, and was also tested at Round 1 in Puente Hills, California in January 2017. In 2021, several “classic” cabinets with the FiNALE version installed, appeared at the Round 1 at Deptford Mall in New Jersey.

In a livestream on 10 July 2019, Sega announced maimai DX, a reworked version of the game which featured new, second-generation cabinets. This version subsequently generated several sequel games of its own.

Overview 
The defining feature of maimai's arcade cabinet is its striking resemblance to a front-loading washing machine. Early advertisements and promotional materials had different joke catchphrases sprinkled in, such as "It's not a washing machine!" and "No water." At its first deployment test, maimai had "NO WASHING" written on its cabinet. Early in development, the original concept was actually a music player, instead of a rhythm game. Up to 2 players can play per cabinet, and up to 4 players can play together with more cabinets. The motherboard can be accessed using the back door on the player 2 side. The original design was made in collaboration with Electronics manufacturer Sharp in Sega's maimai LIVE 2014 Washing Festival event.

To save their personal play data, players can use an "Aime" IC card with the machine to log into their account. From October 25, 2018 onward, other IC cards from other developers such as "Project DIVA" and "BanaPassport" cards will also work with maimai.

Using a computer or smartphone, a player can use maimaiNET (now maimai DX NET) to access detailed information on their account like scores and earned achievements as well as change their account name. Before maimai DX was released, it was possible to link a niconico account to upload a recording of the play from the camera built into the arcade machine. Even without a niconico account, the player could view the recording. However, in the summer of 2019, this integration was removed with the release of maimai DX, and a camera and photo gallery was added instead, where commemorative photos at the end of a song could be saved instead. The recording function was completely removed in favor of the photos.

Since the cabinet uses only one computer for both players, if a player is already playing on a machine, the second player's input will not work at all until the end of the game. The background image during this time states "Please wait until the play is finished".

Basic gameplay 

Various kinds of notes will appear at the centre and approach the outer rim of the circular touchscreen. The player must tap, hold or slide on the touchscreen or surrounding buttons in time with the music, depending on the type of note.

The types of notes in the game include:
 Tap: A pink circular ring, requiring a single tap when it reaches the edge of the screen.
 Break: A red-yellow ring (or a hexagonal bar, the path of a star), requiring a single tap and gives more points than a tap, as well as requiring a 'Critical Perfect' for the full score of the note. Stars representing slides can also be 'break' notes.
 Hold: A pink hexagonal bar, requiring holding for the entire length. Releasing early, or releasing midway and pressing down again will result in less points and a 'Fast/Late Perfect', 'Great' or 'Good' rating for the object.
 Slide: A star followed by a path. The star counts like a tap, followed by a slide parth starting one beat after the star is tapped. The player must trace along the path.
 Both: A combination of two (or more) tap, hold or slide notes, now colored yellow.
 Touch: A blue note (yellow when two or more notes) in the middle area of the screen that requires a single tap when the outside arrows close in.
 Touch Hold: A multicolored note in the middle area of the screen that requires holding for the entire length.
 EX: Shines brighter than other notes, and any non-'miss' judgment is a 'Critical Perfect'.

Many players wear gloves during gameplay, in order to dampen the impact of hitting buttons and allow for easier sliding on the glass screen, as well as to avoid injuries caused by friction at higher levels of play.

Songs 
Along with officially licensed songs from popular artists, vocaloid songs, Touhou Project arrangements, songs from other Sega video games, and maimai original songs are also often added to the library. Each song has a unique background image, and in some cases may be the original PV corresponding to the song. Currently, songs in maimai are sorted into categories based on where they originated from, with the main categories being:

 POPS&ANIME: J-pop songs and anime soundtracks.
 niconico&VOCALOID: Songs originally uploaded to the site niconico, or using the vocaloid voice synthesizer.
 東方Project (Touhou Project): Arrangements of Touhou Project soundtracks.
 GAME&VARIETY: Songs originating from other games, as well as songs that do not fit in any other category.
 maimai: Songs exclusively commissioned for maimai.
 ONGEKI&CHUNITHM: Songs originating from ONGEKI and CHUNITHM, rhythm games also developed by Sega.

They may also be found in other categories for reasons like events and new releases.

Each song in the game has four to five playable difficulty levels. The four regular difficulty levels are: Basic, Advanced, Expert, and Master. Master mode is only unlocked upon achieving an S rank (97% and above) on the 'Expert' difficulty of a song. Alternatively, an S rank on the 'Master' chart of the song (if available for selection) will unlock the 'Master' chart itself. A Re:MASTER mode is available for selected songs and will be unlocked after achieving a Rank S score on the 'Expert' or 'Master' difficulty. (S ranks achieved before the addition of Re:MASTER mode on songs will not be counted). An exception to this is songs added before maimai DX, whose Master and Re:MASTER charts are unlocked by default without requiring any other conditions. Some songs are also hidden, and only unlocked when certain conditions are met.

in addition to the above difficulty levels, each song is also assigned a numerical level, on a scale of 1 to 15. With the exception of level 1-6 and 15, there is also a harder "+" equivalent for each level (e.g. 7+, 9+, 11+,...).

Scoring

Achievement ranking 
maimai's scoring system includes alphabetical ranks and a percentage score up to 101.0000% calculated based on the player's note judgements, which go from (in order from least to most accurate): 'Miss', 'Good', 'Great', 'Perfect' and 'Critical Perfect'.

In order to CLEAR a song, players must score at least 80% on a song. In maimai PiNK, the ranking system changed from D-SS to F-SSS. In maimai MiLK PLUS, 3 new ranks, namely S+, SS+ and SSS+, were added to the ranking system, thus changing the system to F-SSS+. In maimai DX, ranks F and E were removed, and the B rank was split into B, BB and BBB, making the system D-SSS+.

Players can also earn the following additional achievements if certain conditions are met:

DX Rating 
In addition to individual song achievement rates and ranks, each player account also has a numerical rating attached called 'DX Rating', which serves as an indication of the player's overall skill level.

Song rating 
Every play is assigned a rating value, which is calculated using the following formula:

 

Within the 1 to 15 difficulty scale, each song is also assigned an internal decimal level number, with x.7 to x.9 being rounded to x+ in-game. This internal level is used for the rating calculation.

While the achievement rate scale goes up to 101.0000%, the rate used for rating calculation is capped to 100.5000%, with all rates above being rounded down to 100.5000%.

The rank coefficients used for rating calculation are as follows:

Total rating 
Songs are split into two categories for the total rating calculation: old songs and new songs. Songs released within the current version of the game are considered new songs, while songs released in past versions are considered old songs (an exception is new Re:MASTER charts added for old songs; these are considered new songs if the chart was added in the current version).

The player's total rating is calculated as the sum of the ratings of the top 15 new songs and top 35 old songs. Rating numbers are by default displayed along with the player's username (though this option can be turned off), with unique badges for certain rating ranges, ranging from the default white and blue for 999 and under to rainbow for 15000 and up.

maimai NET 

maimai NET(now maimai DX NET) are the names for maimai's player account website. To enable these services, a Sega ID or other IC card with play data has to be linked.

In earlier versions, if the game cabinet had a camera installed, players could record one of their played songs and access them on the website maimaiNET, which could then be downloaded and posted to sites like niconico and YouTube.

Its functions include:

 Changing account username
 Editing user profile that friends can see
 Changing game settings (speed, sound, rating, rank, display rank)
 Registered friends' account status (high scores, achievements)
 Check account's highscores
 Check different rankings (deluxe ranking, friends ranking, prefecture, nationwide)
 Post score screenshots to twitter

Collectibles 
By doing certain achievements and actions in the game, the player can earn various badges for their maimaiNET profile, as well as player icons and titles. Some are hidden achievements found only through playing the game. Some achievements may also unlock songs.

Series 

 maimai - The first generation arcade cabinet of the maimai series, released on July 11, 2012.
 maimai PLUS, an upgraded version to the original maimai cabinet, released on December 13, 2012.
 maimai GreeN, released on July 11, 2013.
 maimai GreeN PLUS, began location tests on January 31, 2014, and officially released on February 26, 2014.
 maimai ORANGE, released on September 18, 2014.
 maimai ORANGE PLUS, released on March 19, 2015.
 maimai PiNK, released on December 9, 2015.
 maimai PiNK PLUS, released on July 30, 2016.
 maimai MURASAKi, released on December 15, 2016.
 maimai MURASAKi PLUS, released on June 22, 2017.
 maimai MiLK, released on December 14, 2017.
 maimai MiLK PLUS, released on June 21, 2018.
 maimai FiNALE, the last version of the first generation cabinet, released on December 13, 2018. Online service has ended since September 3, 2019 in Japan.
 maimai DX, the first version of the second generation arcade cabinet, released on July 11, 2019.
 maimai DX PLUS, released on January 23, 2020.
 maimai DX Splash, released on September 17, 2020.
 maimai DX Splash PLUS, released on March 18, 2021.
 maimai DX UNiVERSE, released on September 16, 2021.
 maimai DX UNiVERSE PLUS, released on March 24, 2022.
 maimai DX FESTiVAL, released on September 15, 2022.

Characters 

 Milk
 Born on June 25 (age 10)
 Voiced by: Asuka Ito
 Height: 157 cm

 Shama
 Born on March 19 (age 18)
 Voiced by: Atsumi Tanezaki
 Height: 157 cm

 Otohime
 Born on August 22 (age 18)
 Voiced by: Yu Asakawa
 Height: 152 cm

 Ras
 Born on December 7 (age 15)
 Voiced by: Ayane Sakura 
 Height: 158 cm

 Chiffon
 Born on May 4 (age 17) 
 Voiced by: MAKO
 Height: 160 cm

 Salt
 Born on August 23 (age 12) 
 Voiced by: Hiromi Igarashi
 Height: 142 cm

 Kame
 Born April 21
 Height: 178 cm

 Tai
 Born March 20
 Height: 182 cm

Notes

References 

2012 video games
Music video games
Arcade video games
Arcade-only video games
Rhythm and meter
Sega arcade games
Science fiction video games
Science fantasy video games
Multiplayer and single-player video games
Video games scored by Hiroshi Kawaguchi
Video games developed in Japan
ALL.Net games